= Astapa drewi =

Scientific classification
- Domain: Eukaryota
- Kingdom: Animalia
- Phylum: Arthropoda
- Class: Insecta
- Order: Lepidoptera
- Superfamily: Noctuoidea
- Family: Notodontidae
- Genus: Astapa
- Species: A. drewi

Binomial name
- Astapa drewi Miller, 2011

Species of moth

Astapa drewi is a moth of the family Notodontidae. It is found in north-eastern Ecuador. It was first described in 2011 by Paul Miller.

== Description ==
The species shows clear differences both externally and in genitals from its sister species Astapa signata.

The length of the forewings is about 15 mm. Forewings are predominantly mossy and olive green with several markings, including a light grey reniform spot and a diffuse dark spot near the posterior wing corner and some reddish-brown banding, and has suffused brown-red and purple-grey scales respectively near the posterior margin and in the post-discal area. Hindwings are purple-grey with diffuse olive and red-brown scales in the tornal area.
