= Astapa =

Scientific classification
- Domain: Eukaryota
- Kingdom: Animalia
- Phylum: Arthropoda
- Class: Insecta
- Order: Lepidoptera
- Superfamily: Noctuoidea
- Family: Notodontidae
- Genus: Astapa; Dognin, 1911

Genus of moths

Astapa is a Neotropical genus of moths of the family Notodontidae, with three described, and possibly several further not yet described, species. Species are known from Colombia, French Guiana and Ecuador.

The genus is closely related to Dottia and Eudognina.

== Species ==
Alexander Schintlmeister lists the following three species in World Catalogue of Insects Volume 11: Notodontidae & Oenosandridae, published in 2013:

- Astapa drewi Miller, 2011 - Ecuador
- Astapa signata Dognin, 1911 - Colombia, Ecuador
- Astapa viridifusca (Schaus, 1905) - French Guiana
