= Astapa signata =

Scientific classification
- Kingdom: Animalia
- Phylum: Arthropoda
- Class: Insecta
- Order: Lepidoptera
- Superfamily: Noctuoidea
- Family: Notodontidae
- Genus: Astapa
- Species: A. signata

Binomial name
- Astapa signata Dognin, 1911

Species of moth

Astapa signata is a moth of the family Notodontidae. It is found in the western Andes of Colombia and Ecuador.

The forewings are green with salmon-coloured and reddish brown regions, especially along the anal margin.
